The 2006–07 Liga Gimel season saw 84 clubs competing in 6 regional divisions for promotion to Liga Bet.

Upper Galilee Division

 F.C. Hurfeish and F.C. Julis registered to play in the league, but withdrew without playing.
 Beitar Abu Snan was dismissed from the league on 6 February 2007 after failing to appear to a match for the second time.
 Beitar Bi'ina was dismissed from the league on 6 February 2007 after failing to appear to a match.
 Hapoel Ironi Hatzor was dismissed from the league on 25 April 2007, after failing to appear for a second match in the season. As the dismissal was given with one match left in the season (not including rescheduled fixtures), the club kept its record in the league, and the rest of its fixtures were registered as a 0–2 loss.

Jezreel Division

Promotion play-offs
As Maccabi Beit She'an and Hapoel Kvalim Mesilot finished level on points and matches won, the two clubs met in a playoff match to determine the league winner and promoted club to Liga Bet.

Maccabi Beit She'an promoted to Liga Bet. During the summer, as Hapoel Reineh folded, Hapoel Kvalim Mesilot was promoted as well.

Samaria Division

Sharon Division

Tel Aviv Division

Central-South Division

References

External links
Liga Gimel Upper Galilee The Israel Football Association 
Liga Gimel Jezreel The Israel Football Association 
Liga Gimel Samaria The Israel Football Association 
Liga Gimel Sharon The Israel Football Association 
Liga Gimel Tel Aviv The Israel Football Association 
Liga Gimel Central-South The Israel Football Association 

6
Liga Gimel seasons